Davis Compton Mills (born October 21, 1998) is an American football quarterback for the Houston Texans of the National Football League (NFL). He played college football at Stanford and was selected by the Texans in the third round of the 2021 NFL Draft. Mills became Houston's starter during his first season and set the franchise record for rookie passing yards.

Early years
Mills was born on October 21, 1998, in Atlanta, Georgia, later attending Greater Atlanta Christian School in Norcross, Georgia. During his career, he passed for 6,290 yards and 66 touchdowns. He was selected to the 2017 U.S. Army All-American Bowl, but was unable to play due to an injury. A five-star recruit, Mills was ranked as the top quarterback in his class. He committed to Stanford University to play college football.

College career
Mills redshirted his freshman year for the Stanford Cardinal in 2017. In 2018, he appeared in one game as a backup to K. J. Costello. He entered 2019 as a backup to Costello, but started six of eight games after Costello was injured. Against Washington State, he set a school record with 504 passing yards. He finished the 2019 season completing 158 of 241 passes for 1,960 yards, 11 touchdowns, and five interceptions. Mills played in five games during Stanford's pandemic-shortened 2020 season, completing 129 of 195 passes for 1,508 yards with seven touchdowns and three interceptions.

Professional career

Mills was selected 67th overall by the Houston Texans in the third round of the 2021 NFL Draft. He signed his four-year rookie contract, worth $5.2 million, with the Texans on May 26, 2021.

2021

Due to incumbent starting quarterback Deshaun Watson being ruled inactive, Mills was named the second option behind Tyrod Taylor. He made his NFL debut during the second half of the Week 2 game against the Cleveland Browns after Taylor was injured, throwing for 102 yards, a touchdown, and an interception in the 31–21 defeat. Mills made his starting debut against the Carolina Panthers the following week, in which he threw for 168 yards and a touchdown. The Texans subsequently lost 20–9. In Week 4, Mills struggled against the Buffalo Bills, completing 11 of 21 passes for 87 yards and four interceptions in a 40–0 shutout defeat. Mills rebounded the following week when he completed 21 of 29 passes for 312 yards and three touchdowns against the New England Patriots. However, the Texans lost 25–22 after surrendering a 22–9 lead in the third quarter.

Mills resumed his backup duties after Taylor returned in Week 5, but ineffective performances from Taylor led to Mills replacing him during a 31–0 shutout defeat in Week 13 against the Indianapolis Colts. Following the game, Mills was announced as the starter for the remainder of the season. Mills won his first NFL game during Week 15 against the Jacksonville Jaguars, completing 19 of 30 passes for 209 yards, two touchdowns, and an interception in the 30–16 victory. He helped lead the Texans to a 41–29 upset over the Los Angeles Chargers the following week, but the game marked the Texans' final victory for the season.

Despite winning only two games, Mills set the franchise record for rookie passing yards at 2,664. His 16 touchdowns and 66.8 completion percentage were also the second-highest among rookie quarterbacks in 2021, behind Mac Jones.

2022

With Watson traded to the Cleveland Browns and the departure of Taylor, Mills was named the Texans' starter for 2022. He began the season against the Indianapolis Colts, completing 23 of 37 passes for 240 yards and two touchdowns. The game ended in a 20–20 tie, the first in franchise history for the Texans. After a Week 11 loss to the Washington Commanders, Mills was benched in favor of Kyle Allen for the Texans Week 12 matchup against the Miami Dolphins. After starting two games where he struggled, Allen was benched in favor of Mills.

NFL career statistics

Records and achievements

Texans franchise records
Most passing yards in a season by a rookie: 2,664 (2021)
Highest completion percentage in a season by a rookie: 66.8% (2021)

References

External links

Houston Texans bio
Stanford Cardinal bio

1998 births
Living people
People from Duluth, Georgia
Sportspeople from the Atlanta metropolitan area
Players of American football from Georgia (U.S. state)
American football quarterbacks
Stanford Cardinal football players
Houston Texans players